The Stictidaceae are a family of fungi in the order Ostropales. The family was first described by Swedish mycologist Elias Magnus Fries in 1849.

Genera
This is a list of the genera contained within the Stictidaceae, based on a 2020 review and summary of ascomycete classification. Following the genus name is the taxonomic authority, year of publication, and the number of species:

Absconditella  – 16 spp.
Acarosporina  – 5 spp.
Biostictis  – 5 spp.
Carestiella  – 2 sp.
Conotremopsis  – 1 sp.
Cryptodiscus  – 46 spp.
Cyanodermella  – 2 spp.
Delpontia  – 1 sp.
Dendroseptoria  – 3 spp.
Fitzroyomyces  – 1 sp.
Geisleria  – 1 sp.
Glomerobolus  – 1 sp.
Ingvariella   – 1 sp.
Karstenia  – 13 spp.
Lillicoa  – 4 spp.
Nanostictis  – ca. 8 spp.
Neofitzroyomyces  – 1 sp.
Ostropa  – 1 sp.
Propoliopsis  – 1 sp.
Robergea  – 12 spp.
Schizoxylon  – 61 spp.
Sphaeropezia  – 33 spp.
Stictis  – 206 spp.
Stictospora  - 1 spp
Stictophacidium  – 3 spp.
Thelopsis  – 24 spp.
Topelia  – 11 spp.
Trinathotrema  – 3 spp.
Xyloschistes  – 1 sp.

References

Ostropales
Lecanoromycetes families
Taxa named by Elias Magnus Fries
Taxa described in 1849
Lichen families